Memorial Collection is a 2009 compilation album of American singer–songwriter and rock and roll pioneer Buddy Holly's master takes and hit singles, including some rare recordings. Along with Down the Line: Rarities, this album was released to commemorate the 50th anniversary of Holly's death (February 3, 1959).

Reception 
In an interview with the Lubbock Avalanche-Journal, Holly's eldest brother Larry Holley commented before hearing both this compilation and Down the Line: Rarities, "María [Elena Holly] told me I was definitely going to just break down and cry when I hear all these CDs, because they've cleaned them (the songs) all up and Buddy's music never has come across so pure before."

The critical reception for Memorial Collection was fairly positive. The Allmusic review by Stephen Thomas Erlewine compliments the collection's progression in Holly's work, while he says that several bootleg recordings, including a ten-disc collection, have more music. Robert Christgau, writing for Blender, thinks that the album could easily have fit on to two discs and says that the most interesting songs on the collection were the "undubbed" recordings. Ed Ward, writing for Paste, complimented Erick Labson's remastering, which he thinks made the recordings clearer than he's ever heard them. He feels that Buddy's New York City recordings produced by Dick Jacobs were the low part of the collection, but that Buddy's apartment tapes were much better. Stephen M. Deusner of Pitchfork Media feels that the Memorial Collection not completely needed most of the songs were already released on From the Master Tapes and Buddy Holly Collection, but he feels that the Memorial Collection still has several interesting tracks, like those with Bob Montgomery, and feels that the "undubbed" recordings add to the collection, but he feels that several of the "finished" recordings should have been included also. The Rolling Stone review of the album by Barry Walters gave a basic description of the album and summarizes Buddy Holly's career.

Memorial Collection generally got higher ratings from critics than Down the Line: Rarities.

Track listing

Personnel 
The following people contributed to Memorial Collection:

Buddy Holly – vocals, guitar
Bob Montgomery – vocals, guitar
Larry Welborn – bass
Jerry Allison – drums, percussion
Sonny Curtis – fiddle on "Soft Place in My Heart", guitar
Don Guess – bass
Grady Martin – guitar
Doug Kirkham – percussion
Owen Bradley – producer
Norman Petty – celeste on "Everyday", organ on "Take Your Time", producer
Harold Bradley – guitar on "Modern Don Juan"
Floyd Cramer – piano on "Modern Don Juan"
Farris Coursey – drums on "Modern Don Juan"
E. R. "Dutch" McMillin – alto saxophone on "Modern Don Juan"
Niki Sullivan – background vocals, guitar
June Clark – background vocals
Gary Tollet – background vocals
Ramona Tollet – background vocals
Joe B. Mauldin – bass
Vi Petty – piano
Bill Pickering – background vocals
John Pickering – background vocals
Bob Lapham – background vocals
C. W. Kendall Jr. – piano
Bob Thiele – producer on "Rave On"
Al Caiola – guitar
Donald Arnone – guitar
Bob Linville – background vocals
Ray Bush – background vocals
David Bigham – background vocals
Tommy Allsup – guitar
George Alwood – bass
Bo Clarke – drums
Al Chernet – guitar
George Barnes – guitar
Sanford Bloch – bass
Ernest Hayes – piano
Sam "The Man" Taylor – tenor saxophone
Panama Francis – drums
Philip Krous – drums
Helen Way – background vocals
Harriet Young – background vocals
Maeretha Stewart – background vocals
Theresa Merritt – background vocals
Dick Jacobs – producer, orchestra director
King Curtis – tenor saxophone on "Reminiscing"
Abraham "Boomie" Richman – tenor saxophone on "True Love Ways"
Waylon Jennings – handclaps on "You're the One"
Ray "Slim" Corbin – handclaps on "You're the One"
Andy McKaie – compilation producer
Erick Labson – digital remastering

Release details

References

External links 

Buddy Holly - Geffen - Buddy Holly's artist page at the Geffen label website

Buddy Holly compilation albums
2009 compilation albums
Albums produced by Owen Bradley
Albums produced by Bob Thiele
Albums produced by Norman Petty
Compilation albums published posthumously